The 2004 Pacific Islander rugby union tour was a series of matches played by the Pacific Islanders in Australia and New Zealand during June and July 2004. The composite team was selected from the best players from Fiji, Samoa and Tonga, as well as Niue and the Cook Islands.

The Pacific Islanders won the first two tour matches against Queensland and New South Wales, but lost the three Test matches played against Australia, New Zealand, and South Africa.

Touring party
The touring party was constituted as follows:

 Manager: Koli Rakore
 Manager Ops & Media: Philipp Muller
 Coach: John Boe
 Assistant coaches: Michael Jones, Viliami Ofahengaue, John Schuster
 Hon. Doctor: Dr. Fakaosi Pifeleti
 Physiotherapists: Jordan Salesa, Karen Sutton
 Trainer: Dominic Fonoti 
 Captain: Inoke Afeaki
 Vice-captain: Mosese Rauluni
 Playing squad:

The Matches

Queensland

New South Wales

Australia

New Zealand

South Africa

See also
 2004 mid-year rugby union tests

References

2004 rugby union tours
2004
2004 in Oceanian rugby union
2004 in Australian rugby union
2004 in New Zealand rugby union
2004 in South African rugby union
2004
2004